Daniel Alvarez is an American former soccer midfielder.

Alvarez graduated from Pine Forest High School.  He attended Furman University, where he was a 1999 First-Team All-American.  He graduated with a bachelor's degree in health and exercise science.  He was inducted into the Furman Paladins Hall of Fame in 2005.

In January 2000, the MetroStars selected Alvarez in the fourth round (thirty-seventh overall) of the 2000 MLS SuperDraft. He did not sign with the MetroStars, but played three games for the Atlanta Silverbacks at the start of the USL A-League season.  On April 19, 2000, the MetroStars traded Alvarez's rights to the Tampa Bay Mutiny in exchange for Daniel Hernández.  Alvarez chose to pursue a contract in Germany.  After unsuccessful trials with Borussia Dortmund, FC Cloppenburg, and FC Nuremberg, he returned to the United States and signed with the Charleston Battery of the USL A-League.  In the spring of 2001, Alvarez was training with the Mutiny when he tore his left anterior cruciate ligament.  He returned home to Fayetteville to recuperate.  While there, he coached with the Fayetteville Force Soccer Club.  In February 2002, the Colorado Rapids selected Alvarez in the third round (twenty-ninth overall) of the 2002 MLS SuperDraft.  The Rapids did not sign him and he began the 2002 season with the Cincinnati Riverhawks before finishing it with the Virginia Beach Mariners of the USL First Division.  He played for the Mariners through the 2004 season.

In 2005, he became an assistant with the Old Dominion University men's soccer team.

References

External links
 Charleston Battery: Daniel Alvarez

1978 births
Living people
American soccer coaches
Soccer players from North Carolina
Atlanta Silverbacks players
Charleston Battery players
Cincinnati Riverhawks players
Furman Paladins men's soccer players
Virginia Beach Mariners players
Virginia Beach Piranhas players
A-League (1995–2004) players
USL League Two players
New York Red Bulls draft picks
Colorado Rapids draft picks
Sportspeople from Fayetteville, North Carolina
All-American men's college soccer players
Association football midfielders
American soccer players